Herbert William Heinrich (Bennington, Vermont, October 6, 1886 – June 22, 1962) was an American industrial safety pioneer from the 1930s.

Biography
He was born on October 6, 1886 in Bennington, Vermont.

He was an Assistant Superintendent of the Engineering and Inspection Division of Travelers Insurance Company when he published his book Industrial Accident Prevention, A Scientific Approach in 1931. One empirical finding from his 1931 book became known as Heinrich's law: that in a workplace, for every accident that causes a major injury, there are 29 accidents that cause minor injuries and 300 accidents that cause no injuries.

Heinrich died on June 22, 1962, at the age of 76.

Heinrich's law

Heinrich's work is claimed as the basis for the theory of behavior-based safety by some experts of this field, which holds that as many as 95 percent of all workplace accidents are caused by unsafe acts. Heinrich came to this conclusion after reviewing thousands of accident reports completed by supervisors, who generally blamed workers for causing accidents without conducting detailed investigations into the root causes.

While Heinrich's figure that 88 percent of all workplace accidents and injuries/illnesses are caused by "man-failure" is perhaps his most oft-cited conclusion, his book actually encouraged employers to control hazards, not merely focus on worker behaviors. "No matter how strongly the statistical records emphasize personal faults or how imperatively the need for educational activity is shown, no safety procedure is complete or satisfactory that does not provide for the ... correction or elimination of ... physical hazards", Heinrich wrote in his book. Emphasizing this aspect of workplace safety, Heinrich devoted 100 pages of his work to the subject of machine guarding. His research is criticized by some, such as Bruce Main and William Edwards Deming, for being outdated and unscientific. Main thinks that Heinrich's law should be replaced by a model that emphasizes safety in design, compared to the former's emphasis on behavior.

Legacy

Heinrich's classic work was refuted by a 1980 book Industrial Accident Prevention, by Nestor Roos, H Heinrich, Julienne Brown and Dan Petersen.

Heinrich Revisited: Truisms or Myths by Fred A. Manuele, CSP, PE [2002,  published by National Safety Council offers the following in the last chapter.

The later book, "On the Practice of Safety, Third Edition," by Fred Manuele [2003,  published by John Wiley & Sons, Inc] further discusses Heinrich and compares and contrasts his finding with those of W. Edwards Deming.

References

1886 births
1962 deaths
Occupational safety and health
American business writers